The 2021–22 Sydney Sixers season was the eleventh in the club's history. Coached by Greg Shipperd and captained by Moises Henriques they had competed in the BBL's 2021–22 season.

Standings

Regular season

Playoffs

Squad information

The current squad of the Sydney Sixers for the 2021–22 Big Bash League season as of 5 February 2021.

 Players with international caps are listed in bold.

Notes

References 

Sydney Sixers seasons
2021–22 Australian cricket season